Seh Chah (also Romanized as Seh Chāh and Sehchāh) is a village in Jolgah Rural District, in the Central District of Jahrom County, Fars Province, Iran. At the 2006 census, its population was 39, in 8 families.

References 

Populated places in Jahrom County